Eklutna Lake (Dena'ina: Idlu Bena) is a  lake in the Municipality of Anchorage, Alaska, near the village of Eklutna.

Access
The only land access is by Eklutna Lake Road, which is described as "narrow and winding with no shoulders". Only unpowered boats and electric trolling motors are permitted, and there is no boat launch ramp. There is a small airstrip at the south end of the lake.

Dam

As a reservoir, the lake is the main source of Anchorage's drinking water and a major source of electricity via a hydroelectric dam that diverts almost all of the water that used to comprise the Eklutna River. The agencies that own the dam are required to begin restoring the river by 2027, and completely restore it by 2032. With the removal of an older, unused diversion dam downstream there is interest in restoring the previous water flow back to the river sooner rather than waiting, in order to provide anadromous salmon habitat, an effort supported by nonprofit groups and U.S. Representative Don Young.

Recreation

The lake contains sizable populations of Kokanee salmon and Dolly Varden trout. Park facilities around the lake include a large campground, picnic areas, and a substantial trail system providing access to backcountry and Eklutna Glacier, the source of the lake and river.

References

Lakes of Alaska